Dominic de Burgo (1629–1 January 1704) was an Irish Roman Catholic cleric who was Bishop of Elphin (1671–1691).

Early life 
Burke or de Burgo, was a native of Craughwell, County Galway, listed by Hugh Fenning as Of the family of Cahirkinvonivy. He was a descendant of the House of Burgh: the surname "de Burgo" is the Latinised form of this name (with the gaelicised form being de Búrca or Búrc).

Career 
de Burgo was professed at Athenry in 1648 and studied for six years in Segovia, later living in Pesaro, Treviso and Milan. He was listed as Definitor for Ireland at the General Chapter at Rome in 1670.

He was consecrated as Bishop of Elphin at Ghent in 1671, he was disliked by Oliver Plunkett, who stated he was "extravagant, imprudent in word and deed." He was exiled in 1691, living in poverty with the Franciscans of St. Anthony's, Louvain, where he died on 1 January 1704.

References

 History of Galway, James Hardiman, 1820
 Irish Dominicans at Lisbon before 1700: a Biographical Register, Hugh Fenning, in Collectanea Hibernica, pp. 27–65 volume 42, 2000
 Burke, Dominic, Tomas S.R. O Floinn, in Dictionary of Irish Biography from the Earliest Times to the Year 2002, pp. 23–24. Cambridge, 2010.

Christian clergy from County Galway
17th-century Roman Catholic bishops in Ireland
Irish Dominicans
House of Burgh
Roman Catholic bishops of Elphin
1629 births
1704 deaths